Tirukkural, also known as the Kural, an ancient Indian treatise on the ethics and morality of the commoner, is one of the most widely translated non-religious works in the world. Authored by the ancient Tamil poet-philosopher Thiruvalluvar, it has been translated into at least 42 world languages, with about 57 different renderings in the English language alone.

Beginning of translations

The Kural text, considered to have been written in the 1st century BCE, remained unknown to the outside world for close to one and a half millennia. The first translation of the Kural text appeared in Malayalam in 1595 CE under the title Tirukkural Bhasha by an unknown author. It was a prose rendering of the entire Kural, written closely to the spoken Malayalam of that time. However, again, this unpublished manuscript remained obscure until it was first reported by the Annual Report of the Cochin Archeological Department for the year 1933–34. It took another three centuries before any translation was published in Malayalam.

The Kural text has enjoyed a universal appeal right from antiquity owing to its secular and non-denominational nature that it suited the sensibilities of all. The universality is such that, despite its having been written in the pre-Christian era, almost every religious group in India and across the world, including Christianity, has claimed the work for itself. Owing to its ethical content, the Kural remained one of the most admired ancient Indian works among the Christian missionaries of the 16th and 17th centuries, who arrived in India during the colonial era and found the Kural text containing many more ideals in addition to those that are similar to their own Christian ideals. This marked the beginning of wider translations of the Kural text.

In 1730, Constantius Joseph Beschi rendered the Kural text into Latin, introducing the work to the Europeans for the first time. However, only the first two books of the Kural text, namely, virtue and wealth, were translated by Beschi, who considered translating the book on love inappropriate for a Christian missionary. Around 1767, an unknown author made the first French translation, which went unnoticed. The Danish Missionary August Friedrich Caemmerer translated it into German in 1803. The first available French version, however, was the one made in 1848 by E. S. Ariel. Here again, only parts of the work was translated. In 1856, Karl Graul translated the Kural into German, claiming that the Kural is closer to the Christian preaching and offers a model of Tamil worldview. The German version was published both at London and Leipzig. In 1865, his Latin translation of the Kural text, along with commentaries in Simple Tamil, was posthumously published.

The first English translation ever was attempted by N. E. Kindersley in 1794 when he translated select couplets of the Kural. This was followed by another incomplete attempt by Francis Whyte Ellis in 1812, who translated only 120 couplets—69 in verse and 51 in prose. William Henry Drew translated the first two parts in prose in 1840 and 1852, respectively. Along with Drew's English prose translation, it contained the original Tamil text, the Tamil commentary by Parimelalhagar and Ramanuja Kavirayar's amplification of the commentary. Drew, however, translated only 630 couplets. The remaining portions were translated by John Lazarus, a native missionary, thus providing the first complete English translation. In 1886, George Uglow Pope published the first complete English translation in verse by a single author, which brought the Kural text to a wide audience of the western world.

By the turn of the twenty-first century, the Kural had already been translated to more than 37 world languages, with at least 24 complete translations in English language alone, by both native and non-native scholars. By 2014, the Kural had been translated to more than 42 languages, with 57 versions available in English. Along with the Bible and the Quran, the Kural remains one of the most translated works in the world. In October 2021, the Central Institute of Classical Tamil announced its translating the Kural text into 102 world languages.

Criticisms on translations
The couplets of the Kural are inherently complex by virtue of their dense meaning within their terse structure. Thus, no translation can perfectly reflect the true nature of any given couplet of the Kural unless read and understood in its original Tamil form. Added to this inherent difficulty is the attempt by some scholars to either read their own ideas into the Kural couplets or deliberately misinterpret the message to make it conform to their preconceived notions. The Latin translation by Father Beshi, for instance, contains several such mistranslations noticed by modern scholars. According to V. Ramasamy, "Beschi is purposely distorting the message of the original when he renders பிறவாழி as 'the sea of miserable life' and the phrase பிறவிப்பெருங்கடல் as 'sea of this birth' which has been translated by others as 'the sea of many births'. Beschi means thus 'those who swim the vast sea of miseries'. The concept of rebirth or many births for the same soul is contrary to Christian principle and belief".

List of translations
Below is a list of translations of the Kural:

See also

 Tirukkural translations into English
 List of Tirukkural translations by language
 List of translators

Notes

References

Further reading

External links 
 Tirukkural in Tamil and English—Valaitamil.com
 G. U. Pope's English Translation of the Tirukkural
 https://www.facebook.com/Tirukkural.in.6.languages/

Tirukkural
Translation-related lists
Translations